Günther Domenig (6 July 1934 – 15 June 2012) was an Austrian architect.

Domenig was born in Klagenfurt, and studied architecture at the Graz University of Technology (1953–1959). After working as an architectural assistant, he set up in practice with Eilfried Huth (1963–1973), producing buildings in a brutalist vein. They designed buildings with exposed concrete that are among the outstanding examples of brutalism in Austria. Both the Pedagogical Academy Graz and the Oberwart Parish Church were commissioned by the Catholic Church. 

Another much-noticed design from this phase is the visionary and unbuildable Stadt Ragnitz project. Here, Huth and Domenig designed a megastructure that is similar to the projects of the so-called Metabolists and Archigram's projects. At the beginning of the 1970s, Huth and Domenig increasingly designed pop-art-architecture. Their temporary buildings for the 1972 Summer Olympics in Munich were colorful and had the rounded corners and playful geometries typical of pop art. The multi-purpose hall of the Institute of the Sisters of St. Francis in Graz is reminiscent of a tortoise shell and thus is organic architecture. 

Domenig's first internationally acclaimed completed work was the Z-bank in Vienna, which signalled a much more expressionistic, counter-modernist aesthetic. He is also known for his own concrete home, the Steinhaus at Lake Ossiach, on which he worked for more than 30 years. Since 2003, Günther Domenig has worked primarily with Gerhard Wallner. They founded the company Domenig & Wallner ZT GmbH.

In addition to his practice, Domenig became a professor at the Graz University of Technology in 1980. He died at the age of 77 in Graz.

Main works

Together with Eilfried Huth 
 1963–68: Pedagogic Academy, Graz
 1965–69: Parish centre, Oberwart 
 1967: Temporary pavillion for the Trigon 67 art exhibition, Graz
 1970–72: Temporary pavillion for olympic swimming pool, Munich
 1970–73: Temporary restaurant for the 1972 Summer Olympics, Munich
 1973–77: Multi-purpose school hall, Graz

As independent architect 

 1974–79: Zentralsparkasse bank, Vienna
 1980–2008: Single family home Steinhaus, Steindorf
 1983–84: Faculty buildings Lessingstraße, Steyrergasse, Technical University Graz
 1987: Funder Factory (Funder Werk II), St. Veit
 1990s: Zentralsparkasse building, modernization and new facade, Vienna
 1992–93: Mursteg bridge, Graz
 1993–94: Center am Kai office block, Graz
 1993–95: GIG, Office building and manufacturing halls, Völkermarkt, Carinthia
 1993–96: RESOWI-Zentrum (university building), Karl Franzens Universität, Graz
 1994–96: Elementary school Simonsgasse, Rosenbergstrasse, Wien-Essling
 1998–2000: Academy of the Arts, Münster
 1998–2001: Documentation Center Nazi Party Rally Grounds, Nuremberg
 1999–2000: Hotel Augarten Schönaugasse, Graz 
 2002–04: T-Center (headquarters building), Vienna (with Hermann Eisenköck, Herfried Peyker)

Decorations and awards

 1967: Austrian builders award for Catholic Educational Academy in Graz (with Eilfried Huth)
 1969: Grand Prix International d'Architecture et d'Urbanisme Cannes (with Eilfried Huth)
 1975: Prix Europeen de la Construction Metallique
 1981: Austrian builders prize for the Z-branch Favoriten in Vienna
 1989: Austrian builders prize for the power plant in Frombork Unzmarkt
 1995: Austrian builders award for the National Exhibition Carinthia: Grubenhunt und Ofensau
 1995: Golden Medal of Honour of Vienna
 1996: Award of Carinthia
 1997: Austrian builders award for RESOWI centre in Graz
 1998: Austrian builders award for the refurbishment of the City Theatre in Klagenfurt
 2004: Grand Austrian State Prize for Architecture
 2004: Austrian Cross of Honour for Science and Art, 1st class
 2006: Austrian State Prize for Architecture and Austrian builders prize for the T-Center St. Marx

Notes

References

External links

 Official website
 In memory of Günther Domenig (1934-2012)

Architects from Klagenfurt
1934 births
2012 deaths
Recipients of the Grand Austrian State Prize
Recipients of the Austrian Cross of Honour for Science and Art, 1st class
Recipients of the Austrian State Prize
Graz University of Technology alumni
Academic staff of the Graz University of Technology